Indalecio Liévano Aguirre (24 July 1917 – 29 March 1982) was a Colombian politician and diplomat, who as the 17th Permanent Representative of Colombia to the United Nations served as the 33rd President of the United Nations General Assembly in 1978. He also served as Colombia's Minister of Foreign Affairs and Minister Plenipotentiary to Cuba.

See also
Liévano–Brutus treaty

References

1917 births
1982 deaths
People from Bogotá
Presidential Designates of Colombia
Foreign ministers of Colombia
Permanent Representatives of Colombia to the United Nations
Ambassadors of Colombia to Cuba
Colombian economists
20th-century Colombian historians
Colombian political scientists
Colombian Liberal Party politicians
Members of the Chamber of Representatives of Colombia
Members of the Senate of Colombia
Presidents of the United Nations General Assembly
20th-century Colombian lawyers
20th-century political scientists